Lugaid (Lughaid, Lughaidh, Lughaí, with all equivalents originally attested as Ogham Lugodeccus) is a popular medieval Irish name, thought to be derived from the god Lug. It is borne by a number of figures from Irish history and mythology, including:

High Kings of Ireland 
 Lugaid Íardonn, legendary High King of Ireland of the 9th century BC
 Lugaid Lámdearg, legendary High King of Ireland of the 9th century BC
 Lugaid Laigde, legendary High King of Ireland of the 8th century BC
 Lugaid Luaigne, legendary High King of Ireland of the 2nd century BC
 Lugaid Riab nDerg, legendary High King of Ireland of the 1st century BC
 Lugaid Mac Con, semi-legendary High King of Ireland of the 3rd century AD
 Lugaid mac Lóegairi (died c. 507), High King of Ireland
 Lugaid Loígde, legendary King of Tara upon whom several of the above may be based

Other historical figures 
 Lugaid mac Nóis, legendary king of Munster and suitor of Emer
 Lugaid mac Con Roí, legendary king of Munster and killer of Cú Chulainn
 Lugaid Lága, henchman of Lugaid Mac Con, regarded as one of the greatest warriors in Ireland

Saints 
 Saint Moluag (died 592), also known as Saint Lughaidh, 6th-century Irish Pict missionary
 Saint Molua, 6th-century Irish saint, founder of Killaloe

See also
Dáire
List of Irish-language given names

References
 James MacKillop, Dictionary of Celtic Mythology. Oxford University Press. 1998.
 Eoin MacNeill, Celtic Ireland. Academy Press. 1981 (reissue with new intro. and notes by Donnchadh Ó Corráin of original Martin Lester Ltd edition, 1921).
 T. F. O'Rahilly, Early Irish History and Mythology. Dublin Institute for Advanced Studies. 1946.

Irish-language masculine given names